Omicron Aquilae (ο Aql, ο Aquilae) is the Bayer designation for a double star in the equatorial constellation of Aquila. The brighter component has an apparent visual magnitude of +5.11, which means it is faintly visible to the naked eye in dark suburban skies.

The primary component, Omicron Aquilae A, is an F-type main sequence star with a stellar classification of F8 V. It has about 125% of the mass of the Sun and 152% of the Sun's radius. With an age of roughly 3.3 billion years, it appears to spinning at a leisurely rate with a projected rotational velocity of 3 km/s. The outer atmosphere has an effective temperature of 6,090 K, giving it the yellowish-white hue of an F-type star.

In 1998, Omicron Aquilae was one of nine stars identified as experiencing a superflare. The first flare observed from Omicron Aquilae  was in 1979, with a magnitude increase of 0.07 and a duration of less than five days. The second occurred in 1980, with a magnitude change of 0.09 and a duration of fifteen days.

There is a magnitude 12.67 common proper motion companion located at an angular separation of 22.5 arcseconds along a position angle of 221°. Based upon its matching parallax value, this corresponds to a projected separation of 431 astronomical units. (Hence, the companion is located at this separation or greater.) Designated component C, this is a small red dwarf star with a stellar classification of M3 V. Component B is an optical companion that appears near the primary only through a chance alignment.

References

External links
 HR 7560
 CCDM 19510+1025
 Image Omicron Aquilae

Aquila (constellation)
Aquilae, Omicron
Aquilae, 54
187691
F-type main-sequence stars
Double stars
097675
7560
BD+10 4073
Gliese and GJ objects